Creese is a surname. Notable people with the surname include:

James Creese (1896–1966), American academic administrator
Len Creese (1907–1974), South African-born British cricketer
Matthew Creese (born 1982), British cricketer
Sadie Creese, British cybersecurity specialist